Mikhail Fedorovich Malakhov  is a Kazakhstani jurist, who served as the second Chairman of the Supreme Court of the Republic of Kazakhstan.

References

External links
 Short biography of Malakhov 

1946 births
Living people
Kazakhstani people of Russian descent
Kazakhstani jurists